The county constituency of Northamptonshire, in the East Midlands of England was a constituency of the House of Commons of the Parliament of England, then of the Parliament of Great Britain from 1707 to 1800 and of the Parliament of the United Kingdom from 1801 to 1832 and was represented in Parliament by two MPs, traditionally known as Knights of the Shire.

After 1832 the county was split into two new  constituencies, North Northamptonshire and South Northamptonshire.

Boundaries
The constituency consisted of the historic county of Northamptonshire. Although the county contained a number of parliamentary boroughs, each of which elected one or two MPs in its own right for parts of the period when Northamptonshire was a constituency, these areas were not excluded from the county constituency. Owning freehold property of the required value, within such boroughs, could confer a vote at the county election. (After 1832,  only non-resident owners of forty shilling freeholds situated in borough seats could qualify for a county vote on the basis of that property.)

Members of Parliament

1290–1640
Constituency created (1290)

As there were sometimes significant gaps between Parliaments, the dates of first assembly and dissolution are given for those up to 1640. Where the name of the member has not yet been ascertained or is not recorded in a surviving document, the entry unknown is entered in the table.

1640–1832

 
Notes

Elections

See also
List of former United Kingdom Parliament constituencies
Unreformed House of Commons

References
Cobbett's Parliamentary history of England, from the Norman Conquest in 1066 to the year 1803 (London: Thomas Hansard, 1808) 
 The House of Commons 1690-1715, by Eveline Cruickshanks, Stuart Handley and D.W. Hayton (Cambridge University Press 2002)
 J E Neale, The Elizabethan House of Commons (London: Jonathan Cape, 1949)
 The Parliaments of England by Henry Stooks Smith (1st edition published in three volumes 1844–50), second edition edited (in one volume) by F.W.S. Craig (Political Reference Publications 1973))

Constituencies of the Parliament of the United Kingdom established in 1290
Constituencies of the Parliament of the United Kingdom disestablished in 1832
Parliamentary constituencies in Northamptonshire (historic)